Blind culture is the shared cultural experience among people who are blind.

People who are not blind often imagine that people who are blind share a cultural identity in the way that other minority groups with shared experiences have a distinct culture. Various blind commentators have responded to this perception by explaining that more commonly, blind people integrate with the broader community and culture, and often do not identify blindness as a defining part of their culture.

People who are blind share the cultural experience of experiencing common misunderstandings from people who are not blind.

References

Blindness
Disability culture
Identity politics